Who Goes Next? is a 1938 British war drama film directed by Maurice Elvey and starring Barry K. Barnes, Sophie Stewart and Jack Hawkins. The story was inspired by the real-life escape of 29 officers through a tunnel from Holzminden prisoner-of-war camp in Lower Saxony, Germany, in July 1918.

Premise
During the First World War, a number of captured British officers attempt to escape from a prisoner-of-war camp.

Main cast
 Barry K. Barnes as Maj. Hamilton 
 Sophie Stewart as Sarah Hamilton 
 Jack Hawkins as Capt. Beck 
 Charles Eaton as Capt. Royde 
 Andrew Osborn as F/O Stevens 
 Frank Birch as Capt. Grover 
 Roy Findlay as Lt. Williams 
 Alastair Macintyre as Lt. Mackenzie 
 Meinhart Maur as Commandant

Production
The film was made at Wembley Studios by Twentieth Century Fox. It was a more expensive production than the quota quickie releases that Fox had previously been making at Wembley.

References

Bibliography
 Low, Rachael. Filmmaking in 1930s Britain. George Allen & Unwin, 1985.
 Wood, Linda. British Films, 1927–1939. British Film Institute, 1986.

External links

1938 films
1930s war drama films
British war drama films
1930s English-language films
Films directed by Maurice Elvey
World War I prisoner of war films
20th Century Fox films
Films shot at Wembley Studios
British black-and-white films
Films set in London
1938 drama films
1930s British films